MathWorld is an online mathematics reference work, created and largely written by Eric W. Weisstein. It is sponsored by and licensed to Wolfram Research, Inc. and was partially funded by the National Science Foundation's National Science Digital Library grant to the University of Illinois at Urbana–Champaign.

History
Eric W. Weisstein, the creator of the site, was a physics and astronomy student who got into the habit of writing notes on his mathematical readings.  In 1995 he put his notes online and called it "Eric's Treasure Trove of Mathematics." It contained hundreds of pages/articles, covering a wide range of mathematical topics. The site became popular as an extensive single resource on mathematics on the web.  Weisstein continuously improved the notes and accepted corrections and comments from online readers. In 1998, he made a contract with CRC Press and the contents of the site were published in print and CD-ROM form, titled "CRC Concise Encyclopedia of Mathematics." The free online version became only partially accessible to the public. In 1999 Weisstein went to work for Wolfram Research, Inc. (WRI), and WRI renamed the Math Treasure Trove to MathWorld and hosted it on the company's website without access restrictions.

CRC lawsuit
In 2000, CRC Press sued Wolfram Research Inc. (WRI), WRI president Stephen Wolfram, and author Eric W. Weisstein, due to what they considered a breach of contract: that the MathWorld content was to remain in print only. The site was taken down by a court injunction.

The case was later settled out of court, with WRI paying an unspecified amount and complying with other stipulations.  Among these stipulations is the inclusion of a copyright notice at the bottom of the website and broad rights for the CRC Press to produce MathWorld in printed book form.  The site then became once again available free to the public.

This case made a wave of headlines in online publishing circles. The PlanetMath project was a result of MathWorld's being unavailable.

See also
List of online encyclopedias
Mathematica

References

External links

Mathematics websites
American educational websites
American online encyclopedias
Mathworld
Encyclopedias of mathematics